Baodu is a halal tripe dish that is part of Beijing cuisine. It is traditionally prepared by the Muslim Hui people.

History
It was first recorded in the Qing dynasty. There are many restaurants and street peddlers selling it in Beijing, such as Baodu Feng, a traditional and well-known restaurant established in 1881.

Description
Traditionally, customers at a baodu restaurant can order various different cuts of lamb or beef tripe to their liking.

Cuts
Beef tripe (mainly divided into four parts)
毛肚: Rumen (black)
百叶: Omasum (white)
肚仁
厚头
Lamb tripe (mainly divided into nine parts; as lamb is more tender than beef, more cuts can be used)
食信: Esophagus
肚板: Rumen
肚领: An uplift of the rumen
肚仁
肚芯
葫芦: Reticulum (or second stomach)
散旦: Omasum
蘑菇：Reticulorumen
蘑菇头: The bottom of the reticulorumen

Cooking techniques
The dish is made of fresh tripe or fresh lamb tripe which is first cut into slices and then simply blanched in boiling water rapidly. Despite it its simplicity, the dish is a test of a cook's ability, requiring rich experience and superb cooking skills to control the time and heat to prevent the tripe from toughening.

Seasoning
The seasoning is mainly a mixture of jiang doufu, sesame paste, and a savory paste made from the flowers of Chinese chives. Additionally, ingredients such as soy sauce, vinegar, coriander, or chopped green onion can be added according to taste.

References 

Beijing cuisine
Offal
Hui people
Halal meat
Chinese Islamic cuisine